This is a list of New Zealand television events and premieres which occurred, or are scheduled to occur, in 1991, the 31st year of continuous operation of television in New Zealand.

Events
3 January - New Zealand television debut of Australian medical drama G.P. on TV3.
4 January - American animated sitcom The Simpsons made its New Zealand premiere on Channel 2. Several years later it was moved to TV3 and later returned to Channel 2 (as TV2 and later as TVNZ 2) in early 2016.
6 January - The popular British cult marionette television series Thunderbirds returned to New Zealand television after a long absence with the series airing in a Sunday morning slot on Channel 2.
4 February - After 2 returned to Channel 2 with a 2.30pm start and a 4pm finish.
7 February - British children's television series Thomas the Tank Engine & Friends aired on TV3 one last time after a huge amount of reruns on the network since the switchover in 1990.
9 February - The Saturday morning programmes The Breakfast Club and What Now returned to Channel 2.
11 February - Wheel of Fortune debuted on Channel 2; it later revived in 2008 on TV One, and a year later they dropped the show due to financial issues.
14 March - New Zealand satirical comedy show More Issues first appeared on TV One.
19 March - Channel 2 transmitted the Australian children's television series Johnson and Friends.
19 March - After a long absence since its last air on 14 November 1989, British children's animation Postman Pat returned to airing in New Zealand with the series now airing on Channel 2. This also marked the third time all 13 episodes of the series were ever broadcast on Channel 2.
1 April - TV3 debuted a brand new children's educational series titled Aunties' Alphabet.
1 April - Hine Elder returned to hosting children's television with a brand new wrapper programme, The Bugs Bunny Show, which aired on Channel 2. The show included dozens of old classic Warner Bros. cartoons featuring its popular characters such as Bugs Bunny, Daffy Duck, Sylvester, Tweety, Wile E. Coyote, Road Runner, Pepe Le Pew and Porky Pig, special guests, competitions, viewer participation and giveaways and was shown weekdays at 5pm.
30 April - TV One premiered the popular British sitcom Keeping Up Appearances starring Patricia Routledge.
7 May - British children's television series Thomas the Tank Engine & Friends returns to airing on TV3 and continues broadcasting on the channel in the afternoons once again.
8 May - US animated environmental series Captain Planet and the Planeteers got its proper television premiere on Channel 2 after airing in the previous year with only one episode as an introduction. The series would begin with its very first episode "A Hero for Earth".
4 June - The last in series one of Johnson and Friends was shown on Channel 2 with "Cleaning Day". The iconic Australian children's TV series itself would return for a rerun on 10 December.
14 June - A brand new political chat show titled The Ralston Group began on TV3 as a replacement for E Street.
27 September - The British children's television series Thomas the Tank Engine & Friends transmitted on TV3 for the very last time. It would switch over to air on Channel 2 the very next year.
14 October - Cartoon All-Stars to the Rescue was simulcast on both Channel 2 and TV3 at 5pm. It was first shown on TVNZ the year before as a simulcast across TV One and Channel 2. 
17 October - A 10-part comedy/documentary series titled Visual Symphonies began on TV One; it followed Lyn of Tawa (played by Ginette McDonald) on a journey through New Zealand and Australia.
17 October - A new magazine-style infotainment show titled The Paradise Picture Show premiered on Channel 2; it was hosted by Mark Leishman, Judith Kirk (now Jude Dobson) and 'crazy newcomer' Clark Bent (played by Jeremy Corbett).
10 November - Aramoana, a documentary which recalled the experiences the people of the small Otago town of Aramoana, screened on TV One; it was produced by Taylormade for TVNZ.
10 December - Australian children's television series Johnson and Friends aired on Channel 2 in New Zealand for a second time when the series got repeated for the first time.

Debuts

Domestic
11 February - Wheel of Fortune (Channel 2) (1991-1996, 2008–2009)
14 March - More Issues (TV One) (1991-1992)
1 April - The Bugs Bunny Show (Channel 2) (1991-1992)
1 April - Aunties' Alphabet (TV3) (1991)
7 April - Star Runner (Channel 2) (1991)
6 May - Away Laughing (TV3) (1991-1993)
2 June - The Boy from Andromeda (Channel 2) (also Canada) (1991)
14 June - The Ralston Group (TV3) (1991-1994)
20 June - For the Love of Mike (TV One) (1991)

International
3 January -  Bagdad Cafe (TV3)
3 January -  G.P. (TV3)
4 January -  Bonanza: The Next Generation (TV One)
4 January -  In Living Color (Channel 2)
4 January -  The Simpsons (Channel 2)
4 January -  Max Monroe: Loose Cannon (TV3)
4 January -  High Risk (TV One)
4 January -  Top Cops (Channel 2)
4 January -  The Covenant (TV3)
6 January -  Samson and Delilah (TV3)
11 January -  The Riddle of the Stinson (TV One)
11 January -  A Friendship in Vienna (TV One)
13 January -  City Tails (Channel 2)
17 January -  Booker (Channel 2)
24 January -  Waiting for God (TV One)
27 January -  Oh, Mr. Toad (Channel 2)
27 January -  Paradise Ploughed (TV One)
27 January -  Cameraman Who Dared (TV One)
27 January -  J. Edgar Hoover (TV3)
28 January -  Scandal (1989) (TV One)
29 January -  Shadow Play (TV3)
29 January -  Rescue 911 (Channel 2)
29 January -  French Fields (TV One)
29 January -  Evening Shade (Channel 2)
30 January -  Hostile Witness (TV One)
4 February -  Casper and Friends (Channel 2)
4 February -  Haggard (TV One)
16 February -  The Fresh Prince of Bel-Air (Channel 2)
17 February -  Nature of Australia (TV One)
17 February - //// The Secret of the Black Dragon (TV3)
27 February -  A Taste for Death (TV One)
27 February -  Yellowthread Street (TV One)
28 February -  E Street (TV3)
1 March -  Spider-Man (1981) (Channel 2)
6 March -  Jeeves and Wooster (TV One)
9 March -  Sob Sisters (TV One)
11 March -  The Adventures of Don Coyote and Sancho Panda (Channel 2)
18 March -  Goliath Awaits (TV3)
18 March -  Captain James Cook (TV One)
19 March -  Johnson and Friends (Channel 2)
21 March -  What-a-Mess (Series 2) (Channel 2)
22 March -  Killer in the Mirror (TV3)
23 March -  Callie and Son (TV3)
1 April -  Chip 'n Dale Rescue Rangers (TV3)
1 April -  The New Adventures of Winnie the Pooh (TV3)
2 April -  Captain N: The Game Master (Channel 2)
4 April -  The Oldest Rookie (TV3)
5 April -  Quiet Victory: The Charlie Wedemeyer Story (TV One)
5 April -  The Game of Love (TV One)
6 April -  Bill & Ted's Excellent Adventures (1990) (Channel 2)
6 April -  Hey Vern, It's Ernest! (TV3)
6 April -  Bigfoot (TV3)
6 April -  The Adventures of Raggedy Ann and Andy (TV3)
6 April -  Captain Power and the Soldiers of the Future (TV3)
6 April -  The Super Mario Bros. Super Show! (TV3)
6 April - / Beetlejuice (TV3)
7 April -  The Arsenio Hall Show (TV3)
7 April -  Bright Sparks (Channel 2)
7 April -  Superdogs (Channel 2)
8 April -  Twin Peaks (TV3)
8 April -  Confessional (TV One)
8 April -  Lenny (TV3)
10 April -  Boys from the Bush (TV One)
12 April -  Get a Life (TV3)
27 April -  The Happy Apple (TV3)
28 April -  Kappatoo (Channel 2)
30 April -  Keeping Up Appearances (TV One)
7 May -  Wings (Channel 2)
12 May -  The Jetsons Meet the Flintstones (Channel 2)
19 May -  The Green Man (TV One)
19 May -  The Great Los Angeles Earthquake (TV3)
22 May -  Rockin' with Judy Jetson (TV One)
26 May -  The Silver Chair (Channel 2)
27 May -  A Dangerous Life (TV One)
28 May -  Lifestories (TV One)
30 May -  All Together Now (Channel 2)
31 May -  Coconuts (Channel 2)
1 June -  The Martian Chronicles (TV3)
1 June -  Rude Dog and the Dweebs (Channel 2)
1 June -  Lerne and Loewe: Broadway's Last Romantics (TV3)
10 June -  Well Loved Tales (Channel 2)
10 June -  LBJ: The Early Years (TV One)
11 June -  One Foot in the Grave (TV One)
15 June -  Hey Hey It's Saturday (Channel 2)
17 June - /// Race for the Bomb (Channel 2)
19 June -  Penny Crayon (Channel 2)
19 June - // Passion and Paradise (Channel 2)
20 June - // The Adventures of the Little Koala (Channel 2)
26 June -  Chances (Channel 2)
30 June -  Blind Faith (TV3)
1 July -  Samurai Pizza Cats (Channel 2)
2 July -  Fields of Fire III (TV One)
3 July -  Working It Out (Channel 2)
6 July -  Guys Next Door (TV3)
6 July -  Elvis (Channel 2)
6 July -  The Australians (TV3)
6 July -  Heroes (TV3)
7 July -  Streetwise (Channel 2)
20 July -  Strange Interlude (TV3)
24 July -  Class Cruise (TV One)
24 July -  Neon Rider (Channel 2)
25 July -  Super Force (Channel 2)
29 July -  Law & Order (TV3)
29 July -  Crosstown (TV3)
29 July -  Birds of a Feather (TV One)
5 August -  A Ticket to Ride (TV One)
10 August -  B.L. Stryker (TV One)
12 August -  Toucan Tecs (Channel 2)
12 August -  Top Cops (Channel 2)
17 August -  Glory Enough for All (TV3)
17 August -  Hound Town (Channel 2)
19 August -  The Incredible Hulk Returns (TV3)
19 August -  Bertie the Bat (Channel 2)
21 August -  Jackaroo (Channel 2)
24 August -  What a Dummy (TV3)
2 September -  Good Sports (Channel 2)
7 September -  Swamp Thing (1991) (Channel 2)
10 September - / Kitty Cats (Channel 2)
11 September -  Beverly Hills, 90210 (Channel 2)
11 September -  Yogi and the Invasion of the Space Bears (TV One)
11 September - / Fox's Peter Pan and the Pirates (Channel 2)
11 September -  The Muppets at Walt Disney World (TV3)
14 September -  Attack of the Killer Tomatoes (Channel 2)
14 September -  We Are Seven (TV One)
23 September -  Jimbo and the Jet-Set (Channel 2)
24 September -  Rules of Engagement (TV One)
25 September -  Tropical Heat (TV3)
27 September -  Detective Sadie and Son (Channel 2)
27 September -  The Stepford Children (TV One)
30 September -  Double Dare (TV3)
13 October -  Parker Lewis Can't Lose (Channel 2)
17 October - / Saban's Adventures of the Little Mermaid (Channel 2)
17 October -  Desperado (TV One)
18 October -  Going Places (Channel 2)
20 October -  The Wizard of Oz (Channel 2)
26 October -  Bobby's World (Channel 2)
26 October -  The World's Greatest Stunts (Channel 2)
3 November -  Road to Avonlea (Channel 2)
4 November -  The Bullwinkle Show (Channel 2)
11 November -  Nellie the Elephant (Channel 2)
11 November -  Studs (Channel 2)
17 November -  Cross of Fire (TV3)
17 November -  Maid Marian and Her Merry Men (Channel 2)
21 November - / The Little Flying Bears (Channel 2)
23 November -  New Attitude (Channel 2)
23 November -  Ferris Bueller (Channel 2)
25 November -  The Piglet Files (TV One)
7 December -  The Seekers (TV3)
9 December - / Nonni and Manni (TV One)
11 December - / Jayce and the Wheeled Warriors (Channel 2)
13 December -  The Flash (Channel 2)
25 December -  The Fool of the World and the Flying Ship (Channel 2)
29 December -  Brotherhood of the Rose (TV3)
 Tiny Toon Adventures (Channel 2)
 Stars in Their Eyes (Channel 2)
 World of Discovery (TV3)

Changes to network affiliation
This is a list of programs which made their premiere on a New Zealand television network that had previously premiered on another New Zealand television network. The networks involved in the switch of allegiances are predominantly both free-to-air networks or both subscription television networks. Programs that have their free-to-air/subscription television premiere, after previously premiering on the opposite platform (free-to air to subscription/subscription to free-to air) are not included. In some cases, programs may still air on the original television network. This occurs predominantly with programs shared between subscription television networks.

International

Subscription television

International

Subscription premieres
This is a list of programs which made their premiere on New Zealand subscription television that had previously premiered on New Zealand free-to-air television. Programs may still air on the original free-to-air television network.

International

Television shows
What Now (1981–present)
Blind Date (1989–1991)
The Early Bird Show (1989–1992)
Shark in the Park (1989–1991)
After 2 (1989–1991)
New Zealand's Funniest Home Videos (1990–1993)
60 Minutes (1990–present)
The Boy from Andromeda (1991)
The Ralston Group (1991–1994)
Wheel of Fortune (1991–1996)

Ending this year
August - Blind Date (Channel 2) (1989–1991)
7 December - The Breakfast Club (1989–1991)
18 December - Shark in the Park (TV One) (1989–1991)
Krypton Factor (Channel 2 (1987–1991)
After 2 (Channel 2) (1989–1991)
A Question of Sport (TV One) (1988–1991)

Births
4 January - Olivia Tennet, Shortland Street actress and dancer
27 January - Beth Chote, actress

Deaths
7 August - Billy T. James, comedian, 43 (heart failure)

References